is a Japanese actor, voice actor and narrator. He is currently a freelancer.

He played Sesshomaru in Inuyasha, and after Hirotaka Suzuoki's death, he took over the roles of Bright Noa and Saitō Hajime.

Filmography

Television animation 
 The Brave of Gold Goldran (1995) (Dran, Goldran, Sky Goldran, Great Goldran)
 Eat-Man (1997) (Stow)
 All Purpose Cultural Cat Girl Nuku Nuku (1998) (Hell Mishima)
 Arc the Lad (1999) (Kelbe)
 I'm Gonna Be An Angel! (1999) (Kai)
 Inuyasha (2000) (Sesshomaru)
 Bobobo-bo Bo-bobo (2001) (Ochoboguchi-kun)
 Dokkoider (2003) (Pierre)
 Bleach (2005-2012, 2022) (Ryūken Ishida)
 Black Lagoon (2006) (Gruppenführer)
 Naruto (2006) (Nanafushi)
 Yu-Gi-Oh! GX (2006) (Giese Hunt)
 Shijō Saikyō no Deshi Kenichi (2006-2007) (Odin)
 Code Geass (2006-2008) (Jeremiah Gottwald)
 Amatsuki (2008) (Byakuroku)
 Gin Tama (2008) (Douman, Haga)
 Bakugan: Gundalian Invaders (2010) (Emperor Barodius)
 Naruto Shippuden (2010) (Hayama Shirakumo)
 Yu-Gi-Oh! Zexal (2011) (Jin)
 Btooom! (2012) (Masahito Date)
 Sword Art Online (2012) (Grimlock)
 Saint Seiya Omega (2013) (Dragon Shiryu)
 Akame ga Kill! (2014) (Dr. Stylish)
 High School DxD BorN (2015) (Shalba Beelzebub)
 Schwarzesmarken  (2016) (Heinze Axmann)
 JoJo's Bizarre Adventure: Golden Wind (2018) (Illuso)
 Yashahime: Princess Half-Demon (2020) (Sesshomaru)
 Spriggan (2022) (Kōichi Moroha)

Unknown date
 Case Closed (Etoh, Muraki)
 E's Otherwise (Dr. Asakawa)
 Eden's Bowy (Wietoo)
 Elemental Gelade (Gladius)
 Fancy Lala (Komiyama)
 Fushigi Yūgi (Tetsuya Kajiwara)
 Gakuen Heaven (Jin Matsuoka)
 Ghost Hunt (Koujo Lin)
 Goshūshō-sama Ninomiya-kun (Mikihiro Tsukimura)
 Gundam Build Fighters (Kato)
 Hitohira (Takashi Katsuragi)
 Inukami! (Shinigami: Sea of Violence(Bouryoku no Umi))
 Inazuma Eleven (Ryuichi Kenzaki)
 Kyōshirō to Towa no Sora (Kazuya Ayanokōji)
 Le Chevalier D'Eon (Durand)
 Loveless (Seimei Aoyagi)
 Magical Girl Lyrical Nanoha Strikers (Jail Scaglietti)
 Nurarihyon no Mago (Storyteller)
 One Piece (Suleiman)
 Onegai My Melody (Man's Brothers, ep. 37)
 Reborn! (Adult Reborn)
 Saiyuki (Koumyou Sanzo)
 Scrapped Princess (Lenard)
 Seikon no Qwaser (Friederich Tanner)
 Rockman EXE Stream (Noboru Sunayama)
 Rurouni Kenshin: Shin Kyoto-Hen (Saitō Hajime)
 Skip Beat  (Ren Tsuruga)  (drama CD only)
 Sonic X (Black Narcissus)
 Star Twinkle PreCure (Fuyuki Kaguya)
 Toward the Terra (Glaive Murdock)
 Transformers (Construction Robot)
 Unbreakable Machine-Doll (Bronson)
 Uragiri wa Boku no Namae o Shitteiru (Isuzu Fujiwara)
 Vampire Princess Miyu (Barrow, ep. 13–14)
 Wandaba Style (Ichirin)
 The Wallflower (Host Club Owner, ep. 3)

Original video animation 
 Araiso Private High School Student Council Executive Committee (????) (Matsumoto Takahisa)
 All Purpose Cultural Cat Girl Nuku Nuku DASH! (????) (Juuza Mishima)
 Angelique (????) (Arios)
 Fushigi Yūgi (????) (Tetsuya Kajiwara, Suzaku Seikun)
 Fushigi Yūgi Eikoden (????) (Tetsuya Kajiwara, fake Suzaku)
 Yamato 2520 (1995) (Thompson)
 Mobile Suit Gundam Unicorn (2011) (Bright Noa)
 Rurouni Kenshin: Shin Kyoto-Hen (2012) (Saitō Hajime)
 Mobile Suit Gundam: The Origin (2018) (Bright Noa)

Theatrical animation 
 X/1999 (1996) (Fūma Monou)
 6 Angels (2002) (Mike)
 Inuyasha the Movie: Affections Touching Across Time (2001) (Sesshomaru)
 Inuyasha the Movie: Swords of an Honorable Ruler (2003) (Sesshomaru)
 Inuyasha the Movie: Fire on the Mystic Island (2004) (Sesshomaru)
 Naruto the movie: Blood Prison (2011) (Hayama Shirakumo)
 Mobile Suit Gundam: Cucuruz Doan's Island (2022) (Bright Noa)
 Mobile Suit Gundam: Sun of Bright (TBA) (Bright Noa)

Video games 
 Inuyasha (Sesshōmaru) (2001)
 Natsuki Crisis Battle (xxxx) (Tsuguo Nabeshima)
 Angelique series (xxxx) (Arios)
 Bleach: Heat the Soul 6 and 7 (xxxx) (Ryūken Ishida)
 Elemental Gelade series (xxxx) (Gladius)
 Fushigi Yūgi: Suzaku Ibun (xxxx) (Nakago)
 Phantom of Inferno (xxxx) (Scythe Master)
 Resonance of Fate (xxxx) (Vashyron)
 Super Robot Wars Alpha 3 (xxxx) (Calico Macready)
 Melty Blood Actress Again (2008) (Michael Roa Valdamjong)
 Zettai Meikyuu Grimm (xxxx) (Jacob Grimm)
 Zettai Zetsumei Toshi 3 (xxxx) (Keisuke Hikawa)
 Omerta ~Chinmoku no Okite~ (xxxx) (Liu Jien)
 Project X Zone (2012) (Vashyron)
 Project X Zone 2 (2015) (Vashyron)
 Tokyo Afterschool Summoners (2016) (Chernobog, Ded, Hogen)
 Genshin Impact (2020) (Capitano)
 Live a Hero (2020) (Sadayoshi)

 Drama CDs 

 Abunai series 4: Abunai Campus Love (Molester)
 Aigan Shounen (Godo)
 Angel Sanctuary (Archangel Raphael)
 Barajou No Kiss (Schwartz Yamamoto)
 Baito wa Maid!? (Takeaki Esaka)
 Baito wa Maid!? 2 - Shuubun!? Senden!? (Takeaki Esaka)
 Blue na Koneko (Hiroki Kuzumi)
 Brother (Pervert - Guest in volume 1)
 Danshiryou de Romance wo (Harumi Izumozaki)
 Endless series 3: Endless Love (Yoshimune Takara)
 Final Fantasy: Unlimited (Soljashy)
 Finder Series (Yan Tsu)
 Gisou Renai no Susume (Shuyo Akitsu)
 Hameteyaru! (Eiji Tatsumi)
 Heroic Spirit Lore Strange Tales ～ King of the Cavern Edmond Dantès ～ (Michael Roa Valdamjong)
 Katsuai series 1 (Touru Kurosaki)
 Katsuai series 2: Bakuren (Touru Kurosaki)
 Kedamono Series (Rei)
 Kodomo no Hitomi (Hitoshi Kashiwabara)
 Koi ni Inochi wo Kakeru no sa (Togashi)
 Koi no series 1: Koi no Tasting (Keisuke Nakamura)
 Koi no series 2: Koi no Seasoning (Keisuke Nakamura)
 Kubisuji ni Kiss ~Hong Kong Yakyoku~ (Suchue)
 Loveless (Seimei Aoyagi)
 Love Seeker (Kyousuke Suga)
 Milk Crown no Tameiki (Shinobu Takatou)
 Muteki na Bokura Series 1 (Satoshi Tsuyuki)
 Muteki na Bokura Series 2: Oogami Datte Kowakunai (Satoshi Tsuyuki)
 Muteki na Bokura Series 3: Shoubu wa Korekara! (Satoshi Tsuyuki)
 Muteki na Bokura Series 4: Saikyou na Yatsura (Satoshi Tsuyuki)
 Muteki na Bokura Series side story 1: Aitsu ni Muchuu (Satoshi Tsuyuki)
 Pink na Koneko (Hiroki Kuzumi)
 Omerta ~Chinmoku no Okite~ (Liu Jien)
 Ore no Mono! (Shou Hatori)
 Oresama Teacher (Takaomi Saeki)
 Saredo Futeki na Yatsura (Renji Ootsuki)
 Seikimatsu Tantei Club (John Garidebu)
 Shoukugyo, Ouji (Saido)
 Shounen Yonkei Skip Beat! (Ren Tsuruga)
 Slaver Series (Shigeru Yamawaki)
 Suit and Ribbon Tie (Hiroshi Tanabe)
 The Tyrant Falls in Love (Kunihiro Morinaga)
 Tsuki to Sabaku no Neru Yoru (Yazid)
 Wagamama Daiou ni Ki wo Tsukero (Yoshifumi Ikoma)
 Yume Miru Seiza (Yaginuma)

 Dubbing roles 
Live-action
 12 Years a Slave (Samuel Bass (Brad Pitt))
 28 Days (Jasper (Dominic West))
 300: Rise of an Empire (Aeschylus (Hans Matheson)
 Ace Ventura: Pet Detective (Dan Marino)
 Ace Ventura: When Nature Calls (Prince Ouda (Maynard Eziashi))
 American Reunion (Jim Levenstein (Jason Biggs))
 Apollo 13 (2003 Fuji TV edition) (John Aaron (Loren Dean))
 Criminal Minds (Charles)
 Dark Angel (Alec McDowell (Jensen Ackles))
 Deep Rising (2000 TV Asahi edition) (Mamooli (Cliff Curtis))
 Donnie Darko (Prof. Kenneth Monnitoff (Noah Wyle))
 Dragonheart (King Einon (David Thewlis))
 From the Earth to the Moon (Michael Collins (Cary Elwes))
 End of Days (Hospital Cop)
 ER (Dennis Gant (Omar Epps))
 Good Will Hunting (Clark (Scott William Winters))
 The Green Mile (William "Wild Bill" Wharton (Sam Rockwell))
 H (Jo Seung-woo)
 Hocus Pocus (Dave Dennison (Charles Rocket))
 Lara Croft: Tomb Raider (Bryce (Noah Taylor))
 Lara Croft: Tomb Raider – The Cradle of Life (Bryce (Noah Taylor))
 Mighty Morphin Power Rangers (Skull, Baboo)
 Mindhunters (Bobby Whitman (Eion Bailey))
 Mission: Impossible – Ghost Protocol (Trevor Hanaway (Josh Holloway))
 The Mortal Instruments: City of Bones (Valentine Morgenstern (Jonathan Rhys Meyers))
 Mortal Kombat (Liu Kang (Robin Shou))
 My Own Private Idaho (Mikey Waters (River Phoenix))
 Never Been Kissed (Sam Coulson (Michael Vartan))
 Open Water 2: Adrift (James (Richard Speight Jr.))
 Painted Faces (Teenage Yuen Biao)
 Parenthood (1994 TV Tokyo edition) (Tod Higgins (Keanu Reeves))
 Paul Blart: Mall Cop 2 (Vincent Sofel (Neal McDonough))
 Platoon (2003 TV Tokyo edition) (Francis (Corey Glover))
 Rome (Marcus Junius Brutus (Tobias Menzies))
 Romeo + Juliet (Mercutio (Harold Perrineau))
 The Rum Diary (Hal Sanderson (Aaron Eckhart))
 Seinfeld (Jerry Seinfeld)
 She-Wolf of London (Julian Matheson (Scott Fults))
 Speed 2: Cruise Control (2000 Fuji TV edition) (Merced (Brian McCardie))
 The 6th Day (Wiley (Rodney Rowland))
 Third Watch (Bobby Caffey (Bobby Cannavale))
 Three Kings (Sergeant First Troy Barlow (Mark Wahlberg))
 Titanic (Fabrizio De Rossi (Danny Nucci))
 Trainspotting (Thomas Mackenzie (Kevin McKidd))
 Tucker: The Man and His Dream (Preston Tucker, Jr. (Christian Slater))
 Ultraman: The Ultimate Hero (Kyle Morrison, Primary Official (B))
 Vampire vs Vampire (Ah Fong)

Animation

 Johnny Bravo (Johnny Bravo)
 Penguins of Madagascar'' (Classified)

References

External links 
 

1964 births
Living people
Japanese male video game actors
Japanese male voice actors
Male voice actors from Saitama Prefecture
20th-century Japanese male actors
21st-century Japanese male actors